During 1950–51 season Associazione Calcio Milan competed in Serie A and Latin Cup.

Summary 
In season 1950-1951 Milan conquered the title of Italian champion (from 1925 also known as scudetto) after 44 years. In effective number of championships were 36 due to 1908 season the club not playing in, and suspended seasons during World Wars (1915-1919 and 1943–1945). The rossoneri did not win any trophy since 1918: Coppa Mauro (a non-competitive Inter-War tournament ) that means a long period of 33 years. This league was the first title since 1929–1930 season when it was introduced the sole group competition format.

Crucial to clinch this trophy was the three Swedish players known as Gre-No-Li introduced to the calcio last season. Also important were the captain Andrea Bonomi, goalkeeper Lorenzo Buffon, Arturo Silvestri (arrived in the summer from Modena), Carlo Annovazzi, Omero Tognon, Benigno De Grandi, Renzo Burini and Mario Renosto. 
The manager was Lajos Czeizler supported by technical director Antonio Busini.
The team started the tournament with 6 wins in a row. The rossoneri competed hardly against Juventus and Inter (Neroazzurri defeated the club the first derby of the season ) in an incredible offensive season where Milan, Juventus and Inter scored more than 100 goals the rossoneri finally won the championship thanks to lost only 4 games.

Also, in June 1951 the club won the Latin Cup, the most important competition in Europe. In semifinals the Diavoli won 4–1 against Atlético Madrid thanks to a hat-trick of Renosto and 1 goal of Nordahl. In Final against Lille the team won 5–0 with a hat-trick of Nordahl included and two goals of Burini and Annovazzi. Milan won its first international trophy.

Squad 

(Captain)

 (vice-Captain)

Transfers

Competitions

Serie A

League table

Matches

Latin Cup

Semifinals

Final

Statistics

Squad statistics

Player statistics

Appearances

Goalscorers

References

External links 
 
 

A.C. Milan seasons
Milan
Italian football championship-winning seasons